Simon Price is a British music journalist. 

Simon Price or Pryce may also refer to:

 Simon Price (classicist) (1954–2011), English classical scholar
 Simon Pryce (born 1972), Australian musician and performer